Val-Louron is a ski resort in the French Pyrenees, in the department of Hautes-Pyrénées, and the region Midi-Pyrénées.

Toponymy
The ski station is located in the Louron Valley, which is where the name of Val-Louron originated.

Geography
Val-Louron is specifically located in the Pays d'Aure in the Louron Valley, southeast of Bagnères-de-Bigorre and Tarbes, in Bigorre. The nearest commune, by a direct route, is Loudenvielle to the east. By road, the nearest communes are Azet to the north-west, and Génos to the north-east, each situated at either end of the Col de Val Louron-Azet.

Infrastructure

Ski area

 of alpine ski slopes
19 tracks
46 snow guns 
12 lifts
5 circuits for snowshoes
Sled dogs

Tour de France
Val-Louron was the finish for Stage 13 of the 1991 Tour de France, and proved to be decisive. The riders arrived separately and Claudio Chiappucci, along with the eventual winner Miguel Indurain, then occupied two of the first three places in the race. The stage departed from the Spanish town of Jaca and the Col du Tourmalet also featured in the route for the day.

Stage 15 of the 2005 Tour de France also went through Val-Louron, although it took the descent by Val-Louron-Azet. The first rider over the summit was Laurent Brochard.

Related articles
Hautes-Pyrénées
Bigorre

References

External links

Val-Louron ski station website

Ski areas and resorts in France